Enlil-nādin-apli, "Enlil (is) giver of an heir," reigned  1099–1096 BC, was the 5th king of the 2nd dynasty of Isin, and the 4th dynasty of Babylon. He was the son and successor of Nabu-kudurri-usur and was toppled by a revolt led by his uncle, Marduk-nādin-aḫḫē.

Biography

There are few contemporary artifacts attesting to his brief rule. A Lorestān bronze dagger is inscribed with his name and title. A kudurru records the outcome of an inquiry instigated by the king in his 4th year into the ownership of a plot of land claimed by a temple estate. Ekarra-eqisha and Eanna-šuma-iddina, the governors of Bit-Sin-magir and Sealand respectively, were charged with the investigation which upheld a claim based on the actions of an earlier king Gulkišar who had “drawn for Nanse, his divine mistress, a land boundary.” It contains perhaps the earliest example of a Distanzangaben statement recording that 696 years had elapsed between Nabû-kudurrī-uṣur (Enlil-nadin-apli's father) and Gulkišar, the 6th king of the 1st Dynasty of the Sealand, a contemporary of Samsu-ditāna.

A second undated kudurru is reckoned to be from this period, that of Gula-eresh (pictured), because the same governor of Sealand, Eanna-šuma-iddina, also appears on it, this time granting 5 kur of land to his servant. It is particularly noteworthy for the exuberance of its curses:

The Walker Chronicle  tells of his campaign against Assur and his subsequent overthrow, “Enlil-nādin-apli, son of Nabû-kudurrī]-uṣur, marched to Assur to conquer (it). [Marduk-nādin-aḫḫē, brother of N]abû-kudurrī-uṣur, and the nobles rebelled against him and; Enlil-nādin-apli returned to his land and his city. They [kill]ed him with the s[word].”

Inscriptions

Notes

References

 

12th-century BC Babylonian kings
11th-century BC Babylonian kings
12th-century BC rulers
11th-century BC rulers
11th-century BC murdered monarchs
Leaders ousted by a coup
Deaths by blade weapons
Kings of the Universe